Simonnet is a surname of French origin.

List of people with the surname 

 Cécile Simonnet (born 1865), French opera singer
 Danielle Simonnet (born 1971), French politician
 François Simonnet de Coulmiers (1741–1818), French Catholic priest
 Jacques Simonnet, French politician

See also 

Surnames
Surnames of French origin
French-language surnames